The following events occurred in June 1963:

June 1, 1963 (Saturday)
In Vietnam, President Ngô Đình Diệm's office announced the dismissal of the three major officials involved in the Huế incident — the province chief and his deputy, and the government delegate for the Central Region of Vietnam — for failing to maintain order. 
Jomo Kenyatta was sworn in as the first Prime Minister of Kenya.
Manned Spacecraft Center (MSC) announced two space station study contracts to compare concepts for a 24-person orbital laboratory: one with the Lockheed Aircraft Corporation and another with Douglas Aircraft Company, Inc., Missiles and Space Systems Division. The stations were to be designed for a useful orbital lifetime of about five years, with periodic resupply and crew rotations.
Willie Pastrano, a 6 to 1 underdog challenger, won the world light heavyweight boxing championship, defeating titleholder Harold Johnson. Although most sportswriters thought that Johnson had won the 15-round bout in Las Vegas, Pastrano was declared the winner by the judges in a 2 to 1 decision. "I'm not saying that the underworld dictated the decision," Johnson's manager told reporters afterward, "but the betting was 5-1 and 6-1 for my boy? What do you think?"
Died: Alfred V. Kidder, 77, American archaeologist

June 2, 1963 (Sunday)
Fred Lorenzen won the World 600 NASCAR race despite his car running out of gas on the final lap. Junior Johnson had been leading the race until suffering a blown tire with three laps left. Lorenzen's win brought his earnings to "just under $80,000 making him the biggest money winner in stock car racing history", even though the racing season was only half over.
Stage I of Gemini launch vehicle 1 was erected in Martin-Baltimore's vertical test facility. Stage II was erected on June 9, and posterection inspection was completed June 12. Subsystem Functional Verification Tests began June 10.
Born: Anand Abhyankar, Indian Marathi actor, in Nagpur (died 2012)

June 3, 1963 (Monday)
Northwest Airlines Flight 293, a Douglas DC-7C, crashed in the Pacific Ocean west-southwest of Annette Island, Alaska, off the coast of British Columbia, Canada, killing all 101 people on board. Forty-seven years later, the cause of the accident remained unknown and the wreckage of the airplane remained "under more than 8,000 feet of water in the Gulf of Alaska".
At Huế, South Vietnamese soldiers poured caustic chemicals on the heads of Buddhist protesters, and 67 people were injured. The United States' threat of the halting of aid to President Ngo Dinh Diem's regime was sufficient to lead the military to conclude that Diem could be overthrown without an intervention from the U.S.
Died: 
Pope John XXIII, 81, Italian priest. As Cardinal Angelo Giuseppe Roncalli, he had been the Patriarch of Venice when elected on October 28, 1958, to succeed Pope Pius XII as head of the Roman Catholic Church. The Pope's death from stomach cancer, complicated by peritonitis, took place at 7:49 pm in Rome, leaving the papacy sede vacante.
Nazim Hikmet, 61, Turkish poet, of a heart attack while picking up a morning newspaper at the door at his summer house in Peredelkino, USSR.

June 4, 1963 (Tuesday)
Australian diver Max Cramer became the first person to dive to the wreckage of the ship Batavia, exactly 334 years after the Dutch vessel had sunk on June 4, 1629.
The Ayatollah Ruhollah Khomeini, religious leader of Iran's Shi'ite Muslim community, was arrested in the city of Qom after speaking against the emancipation of women in the regime of Shah Mohammad Reza Pahlavi. Khomeini would be imprisoned for eight months, and released in April 1964. Six months later, he would be arrested again and sent into exile in Turkey, then move the following year to Najaf, in Iraq. In 1979, Khomeini would lead the overthrow of the monarchy and the establishment of the Islamic Republic of Iran.
U.S. President John F. Kennedy signed Executive Order 11110, delegating authority to the U.S. Secretary of the Treasury to issue silver certificates under the Thomas Amendment to the Agricultural Adjustment Act.
Robert Wesley Patch, a six-year-old boy from Chevy Chase, Maryland, was awarded United States Patent No. 3,091,888 for a toy truck that could be "readily assembled and disassembled by a child".
McDonnell also presented computer data on studies using a combination of mode 2 and mode 1 for launch to T + 10-second aborts; during this period, mode 1 abort might not be adequate.
Died: Don Fleming, 25, Cleveland Browns safety, electrocuted along with co-worker Walter Smith while working on a construction site near Orlando, Florida.

June 5, 1963 (Wednesday)
The Guinean president Sékou Touré began a presidential visit to the Republic of the Congo, creating a political stir in the country.
Revelations of an extramarital affair between British Secretary of State for War John Profumo and Christine Keeler, and Profumo's subsequent admission that he had lied about the affair to his fellow MPs in the House of Commons, led to Profumo's resignation.
Political demonstrations began in Iran, protesting the arrest of Ayatollah Ruhollah Khomeini by the regime of Shah Mohammad Reza Pahlavi. The uprising coincided with the 10th of Muharam, an Islamic holiday marking the start of the new year, 1383 A.H., and the worldwide mourning for the Roman Catholic Pope. The martyrdom of Islamic clerics on that day, the 15th of Khordad, 1342 on the Persian calendar, is now commemorated as a public holiday in Iran.
A U.S. District Judge Seybourn H. Lynne of Alabama issued an injunction prohibiting the state from blocking the enrollment of the first two African-American students in the history of the University of Alabama.
The first annual NHL draft was held in Montreal, Quebec.
U.S. President Kennedy announced during a speech at the United States Air Force Academy that the United States government would team with private industry to quickly develop "the prototype of a commercially successful supersonic transport superior to that being built in any other country," a reference to the British-French Concorde and the Soviet Tupolev Tu-144. His statement would give rise to the Boeing 2707 ("SST") project.
Afterwards, President Kennedy flew to El Paso, Texas, where he met U.S. Vice-President Lyndon Johnson and Governor John B. Connally, to discuss a presidential tour of Texas to take place in late November 1963, with stops in Dallas, Fort Worth, San Antonio and Houston.
Died: William Baziotes, 50, American abstract painter

June 6, 1963 (Thursday)
Chairman Mao Zedong of the People's Republic of China Communist Party sent a letter to Soviet Premier Nikita Khrushchev, stating that "The Chinese people will never accept the privileged position of one or two superpowers" with a monopoly on nuclear weapons, and then gave the go ahead for China to accelerate its own nuclear program. China would explode its first atomic bomb on October 16, 1964.
A spokesman for General Dynamics Corporation told scientists in Denver that a crewed space mission to the planet Mars could be launched in 1975. Andrew Kalitinsky was a speaker at a two-day symposium by the American Astronautical Society, called "The Exploration of Mars", and envisioned that "a convoy of four multi-ton spaceships" would make the journey. The day before, NASA announced plans to send two satellites to Mars in November 1964 as the first step toward a mission.
On June 6 and 7, officials of the Manned Spacecraft Center made a presentation to NASA Administrator James E. Webb, outlining the benefits of continuing Project Mercury at least through the Mercury-Atlas 10 (MA-10) mission. They thought that the Mercury spacecraft was capable of much longer missions and that much could be learned about the effects of space environment from a mission lasting several days. This information could be applied to the forthcoming Projects Gemini and Apollo and could be gained rather cheaply since the MA-10 launch vehicle and spacecraft were available and nearing a flight readiness status.
Born: Jason Isaacs, English film actor; in Liverpool

June 7, 1963 (Friday)
The Rolling Stones' first single, "Come On", was released in the UK, by Decca Records.  The cover of "an obscure Chuck Berry ditty" would reach #21 on the British chart.
Died: ZaSu Pitts, 69, American actress

June 8, 1963 (Saturday)
The Army of Egypt, intervening in the North Yemen Civil War, made the first use of poison gas in warfare since World War II, dropping chemical weapons, believed to be phosgene, on the village of Al Kawma.
The U.S. National Museum of Naval Aviation opened at Naval Air Station Pensacola in Pensacola, Florida.

In preparation for the Mercury-Atlas 10 (MA-10) mission, should the flight be approved by NASA Headquarters, several environmental control system changes were made in spacecraft 15B. Particularly involved were improvements in the hardware and flexibility of the urine and condensate systems. With regard to the condensate portion, Gordon Cooper, in his press conference, indicated that the system was not easy to operate during the flight of Faith 7 (MA-9).
The first Titan II nuclear intercontinental ballistic missiles became operational, with the activation by the United States of a group at the Davis–Monthan Air Force Base near Tucson, Arizona.
Representatives of NASA, Air Force Space Systems Division, Aerospace, McDonnell, and Martin met to initiate an investigation of the structural integrity and compatibility of the Gemini spacecraft and launch vehicle during the powered phase of the mission. This had been a problem in the first Mercury-Atlas flight. Contractors were instructed to furnish NASA and Space Systems Division with all available structural data by July 15, 1963.
Emile Griffith defeated Luis Manuel Rodríguez at Madison Square Garden to regain his welterweight boxing title for a third time. Rodriguez had defeated Griffith in a bout on March 31.

June 9, 1963 (Sunday)
Fernando Belaúnde Terry was elected President of Peru in a repeat of the June 10, 1962 election that had been annulled by the military five weeks later. Belaúnde and the other two major candidates from 1962 ran again, receiving 708,931 votes, 39% of those cast and more than the one-third required under the Peruvian Constitution.  Víctor Raúl Haya de la Torre, who had won a plurality in 1962, got only 34.3% (623,532) and Manuel A. Odría 25.5% (463,325).
In elections for Mongolia's parliament, the Mongolian People's Republic Party, sole legal political party in the Communist nation, won 216 of the 270 seats.  The remaining 54 seats went to non-party candidates.
Jim Clark won the 1963 Belgian Grand Prix.
Born: Johnny Depp, American film actor; in Owensboro, Kentucky
Died: Jacques Villon, 87, French Cubist painter

June 10, 1963 (Monday)
U.S. President Kennedy announced the suspension of nuclear testing during his commencement address at American University in Washington, D.C., along with the administration's plan to work towards a nuclear test-ban treaty with the Soviet Union and other atomic powers.
President Kennedy signed the Equal Pay Act of 1963 into law in the United States.
Florida Governor C. Farris Bryant signed Senate Bill 125 into law, establishing the University of Central Florida. On January 24, the Board of Controls would select land near the Orange County town of Alafaya, Florida, for the construction of the new campus, and the university would begin classes, under the name Florida Technological University (FTU), on November 1, 1968.
Instructors from McDonnell's training department began conducting two weeks of courses on Gemini spacecraft systems for flight controllers at Manned Spacecraft Center. During May, the nine new astronauts had received similar instruction; the veteran astronauts went through the same course in late June and early July.
Twelve people, 9 of them Explorer Scouts from Provo, Utah, were killed and 26 injured when the truck they were on had a brake failure and rolled backwards off of a steep embankment. The dead scouts ranged in age from 13 to 16 years old, and were riding in the back of the truck on their way to the Hole in the Rock rock formation.
Died: Anita King, 78, American silent film actress who, in 1916, became the first woman to drive an automobile across the United States.

June 11, 1963 (Tuesday)

South Vietnamese Buddhist monk Thích Quảng Đức, 65, committed suicide by self-immolation, burning himself to death at a major intersection in Saigon to protest the oppression of Buddhists by the government of President Ngo Dinh Diem. Associated Press photographer Malcolm Browne was the only journalist "to heed Buddhist advance notices", and his photographs brought worldwide attention the next day, as well as winning him a Pulitzer Prize. "Many point to the self-immolation," one historian would later note, "as the single event that turned the U.S. government against Ngo Dinh Diem, though a series of events and personality clashes made the situation inevitable."

Alabama Governor George C. Wallace stood in the door of the University of Alabama to protest against integration and blocked James Hood and Vivian Malone from enrolling as the first African American students at the University. U.S. Defense Secretary Robert McNamara ordered that the Alabama National Guard be placed under the command of the federal government and directed the 31st Infantry Division of the Guard to proceed to Tuscaloosa. Assistant U.S. Attorney General Nicholas Katzenbach approached Wallace and cited the U.S. District Court order of June 5, requiring that the students be allowed to register, and Wallace replied, "We don't need a speech here," and then read aloud a statement that he did "hereby proclaim and demand and forbid this illegal and unwarranted action by the central government." Governor Wallace stepped aside at 3:40 that afternoon, after the Alabama National Guard commander, Brigadier General Henry V. Graham, told Wallace that the Guard would enforce the President's order, and Wallace, who elected not to be arrested for contempt of federal court, stepped aside.
The first lung transplant on a human being was performed at the University of Mississippi, by Dr. James Hardy. The patient, identified twelve days later as John Richard Russell, a convicted murderer serving a life sentence for a 1957 killing, was given a full pardon by Mississippi Governor Ross Barnett, in recognition of Russell's volunteering for the operation, which Barnett said would "alleviate human misery and suffering in years to come". The donor, never identified, had arrived at the hospital emergency room in the evening after having a massive heart attack, and the family permitted the donation of the left lung for transplant; Russell survived for 18 more days after the surgery.
U.S. President Kennedy delivered a historic Civil Rights Address in which he promised a Civil Rights Bill and asked for "the kind of equality of treatment that we would want for ourselves."
Died: Syed Abdul Rahim, 53, Indian footballer and first manager of the Indian national team

June 12, 1963 (Wednesday)
Medgar Evers, a 37-year-old African-American civil rights activist, was shot and killed while standing in his driveway in Jackson, Mississippi. Byron De La Beckwith was arrested within two weeks. After two trials in 1964 that would both end without the jurors being able to reach a verdict, Beckwith would elude conviction for thirty years before being retried. He would be convicted of the murder on February 5, 1994, and spend the rest of his life in prison, dying in 2001. The Evers home, at 2332 Margaret Walker Alexander Drive in Jackson, Mississippi, is not designated as a historic landmark.
Testifying before the U.S. Senate Space Committee, James E. Webb, the NASA Administrator, said: "There will be no further Mercury shots . . ." with the next crewed missions being with two astronauts each for the Gemini program. Webb felt that the crewed space flight energies and personnel should focus on the Gemini and Apollo programs. Thus, after a period of 4 years, 8 months, and 1 week, Project Mercury, America's first human spaceflight program, came to a close.
The editorial committee formed to compile Gemini Network Operations Directive 63-1 met at Goddard Space Flight Center to plan the writing of the directive. The purpose of this directive was to establish the overall concept of the tracking in instrumentation network for the Gemini program; it was an outgrowth of Mercury Network Operations Directive 61-1, then in force.
The long-awaited film Cleopatra, starring Elizabeth Taylor and Richard Burton, had its worldwide premiere, in New York City. With a running time of 248 minutes, the epic historical drama lasted more than four hours.
Died: Andrew Browne Cunningham, 80, British Admiral who commanded the Royal Navy's Mediterranean Fleet, and the then the Allied Expeditionary Force, during World War II. Nicknamed "ABC", he became the First Sea Lord in 1943.

June 13, 1963 (Thursday)
The Panamanian cargo vessel Carmen sank after colliding with the Turkish ship Sadikzade in the Strait of Dover, and two of its crew drowned; Sadikzade then collided with a Greek ship, MV Leandros, which in turn collided with another British ship MV Clyde Sergeant. These three ships reached port safely.
U.S. Representative Thomas F. Johnson of Maryland, and former U.S. Representative Frank W. Boykin of Alabama, were both convicted of conspiracy to defraud the United States government and accepting bribes. Boykin would later be pardoned, while Johnson, after appealing his conviction all the way to the United States Supreme Court, would serve six months in prison.
McDonnell's Project Mercury contract was terminated; McDonnell had already essentially concluded its Mercury activities and spacecraft 15-B had been delivered to Cape Canaveral. A termination meeting held at the Manned Spacecraft Center on June 14 settled the disposition of Mercury property and personnel. McDonnell was to screen all Mercury property for possible use in the Gemini program; any property McDonnell claimed would be transferred to Gemini by authority of the contracting officer at St. Louis or the Cape. McDonnell was directed to furnish Gemini Project Office with a list of key Mercury personnel who might be reassigned to Gemini.
Rocketdyne completed its initial design of the  thrust chamber assembly (TCA) for both the reentry control system (RCS) and orbit attitude and maneuver system of the Gemini spacecraft. Less than a month later, Rocketdyne recommended an entirely new design, which McDonnell approved on July 5. The redesigned TCA was planned for installation in spacecraft Nos. 5 and up. Meanwhile, however, Rocketdyne had established a thrust chamber working group to improve TCA performance. This group designed, built and successfully tested in pulse operation two 25-pound RCS thrusters much more quickly than Rocketdyne had anticipated; thus the new design configuration was incorporated in the manufacturing plan for spacecraft Nos. 2 and up. In reporting these developments, Gemini Project Office attributed the success of the new design to relaxed test requirements rather than to any breakthrough in design or material.
Manned Spacecraft Center - Atlantic Missile Range Operations Office reported that the malfunction detection system would be flown on Titan II launches N-24, N-25, N-29, N-31, and N-32. The first launch in this so-called "piggyback program" was scheduled for June 21. All preparations for this flight, including installation and checkout of all malfunction detection system components, were reported complete at a Titan II coordination meeting on June 14.
The definitive contract for the Gemini space suit was signed with the David Clark Company. Negotiations had been completed May 28. The estimated cost was $788,594.80, with fixed fee of $41,000 for a total cost-plus-fixed-fee contract of $829,594.80.

June 14, 1963 (Friday)
Valery Bykovsky was launched into orbit by the Soviet Union on board Vostok 5. Bykovsky would spend almost five days in space,  breaking the record recently set by American astronaut Gordon Cooper, and making 82 orbits before returning on June 19, at the same time as Vostok 6 and Valentina Tereshkova.  
Died: Carl Skottsberg, 82, Swedish Antarctic explorer

June 15, 1963 (Saturday)
The French retailing chain Carrefour opened the first hypermarket in Europe. With  of floor space for a grocery store and department store, parking space for 350 cars, and its own gasoline station, the first Carrefour hypermarket was opened at the Paris suburb of Sainte-Geneviève-des-Bois, Essonne.
Gemini Project Office (GPO) reported that the first crewed Gemini mission would be three orbits. Whether so short a mission would allow time to perform the rendezvous experiment called for by the original mission plan remained in doubt, although Flight Operations Division's Rendezvous Analysis Branch had decided during the week of June 2 that a three-orbit mission was long enough to conduct a useful experiment. GPO had directed McDonnell to study the problem.
Born: Helen Hunt, American film actress; in Culver City, California

June 16, 1963 (Sunday)
Valentina Tereshkova of the Soviet Union became the first woman in history to travel into outer space, when she was launched as a cosmonaut on Vostok 6.  Tereshkova was also the twelfth person to be sent into orbit.  A woman would not travel into outer space again for twenty years, with U.S. astronaut Sally Ride being launched on June 18, 1983, as a mission specialist on the space shuttle Challenger.  Tereshkova, who would retire from the Soviet Air Force as a colonel, would marry her fellow cosmonaut, Andriyan Nikolayev, and go into politics, becoming a deputy of the Supreme Soviet, and a member of the Soviet Communist Party's Central Committee.
David Ben-Gurion, Prime Minister of Israel since it had become independent in 1948, resigned for what he described as "personal reasons".  Ben-Gurion also quit his post as Israel's Defense Minister, which he had held since 1955.  He would be replaced by Levi Eshkol.
In an attempt to resolve the Buddhist crisis in South Vietnam, a Joint Communique was signed between President Ngo Dinh Diem and Buddhist leaders.

June 17, 1963 (Monday)
Outside Xá Lợi Pagoda, in Saigon, shortly after 9:00 a.m, a crowd of around 2000 people were confronted by police who still ringed the pagoda despite the signing of the Joint Communique. A riot broke out and police attacked the crowd with tear gas, fire hoses, clubs and gunfire. One protester was killed and scores more injured. Moderates from both sides urged calm while some government officials blamed "extremist elements". An Associated Press story described the riot as "the most violent anti-Government outburst in South Vietnam in years".
Abington School District v. Schempp: The U.S. Supreme Court ruled, 8-1, that state-mandated Bible reading in public schools was unconstitutional.  The case had been consolidated with Murray v. Curlett, brought by Madalyn Murray, who in 1965 would marry to become Madalyn Murray O'Hair, and would become the founder of American Atheists. The Schempp case was not the decision that banned prayer in American public schools, which had been rendered in Engel v. Vitale on June 25, 1962.  
ASCII (United States of America Standard Code for Information Interchange) was approved by the American Standards Association, providing a seven-bit code of up to 128 character positions that could be used for communication between computer information processing systems.
AiResearch installed the Gemini environmental control system (ECS) developmental test unit in a boilerplate spacecraft and began system development testing. Tests were conducted with gaseous rather than cryogenic oxygen until cryogenic tanks became available. AiResearch system development tests ended in September. Early in June, AiResearch shipped an ECS unit to McDonnell, where it was installed in boilerplate spacecraft No. 2 for crewed testing which began July 11.
Died:
Alan Brooke, 1st Viscount Alanbrooke, 79, British field marshal and Chief of the Imperial General Staff during World War II
John Cowper Powys, 90, British novelist

June 18, 1963 (Tuesday)
Stanoje Aksić became President of the Assembly of Kosovo.
A flight evaluation test was conducted on the prototype recovery beacon of the Gemini spacecraft in Galveston Bay. A boilerplate spacecraft was placed in the Bay, and ranging runs were flown on the beacon by airplanes equipped with receivers.
Born:    
Bruce Smith, American NFL defensive end and member of Pro Football Hall of Fame; in Norfolk, Virginia   
Christian Vadim, French film actor, son of Catherine Deneuve and Roger Vadim; in Boulogne-Billancourt
Died: Pedro Armendariz, 51, Mexican actor, shot himself to death

June 19, 1963 (Wednesday)
The Soviet Union's Mars 1 spacecraft came within 193,000 kilometers (120,000 miles) of the planet Mars, the first man-made object to reach the Red Planet, but was unable to return any data to Earth because of a malfunction in its antenna on March 21.
Valentina Tereshkova, the first woman in space, returned to Earth with cosmonaut Valery Bykovsky on Vostok 6.
The papal conclave began its meeting in the Sistine Chapel at the Vatican, to elect a successor to Pope John XXIII. Voting would begin the next day.
What would become the Civil Rights Act of 1964 was sent by President Kennedy to the United States Congress and was introduced the next day in the House Judiciary Committee by U.S. Representative Emanuel Celler. The most comprehensive civil rights legislation in United States history, the legislation would be passed after Kennedy's assassination, with President Lyndon B. Johnson signing it into law on July 2, 1964.
On the same day, President Kennedy secretly approved a CIA program of renewed sabotage of the infrastructure of Cuba, though abiding by his pledge never to invade the Communist island nation.
The Cape Gemini/Agena Test Integration Working Group met to define "Plan X" test procedures and responsibilities. Site of the test was to be the Merritt Island Launch Area Radar Range Boresight Tower ("Timber Tower"), a  x  x  wooden structure.

June 20, 1963 (Thursday)
The United States team won the first ever Federation Cup (tennis), defeating Australia in the finals.
The Moscow–Washington hotline (officially, the Direct Communications Link or DCL) was authorized by the signing of a "Memorandum of Understanding Regarding the Establishment of a Direct Communications Line" in Geneva, Switzerland, by representatives of the Soviet Union and the United States. Though depicted in fiction as a red telephone, the hotline consisted of one teleprinter each in both nations, linked by two cable circuits routed between Washington, D.C., and Moscow by way of London, Copenhagen, Stockholm and Helsinki, and two backup radio circuits that used Tangier (in Morocco) as a midpoint. Initially, the American DCL teleprinter was located inside the Pentagon, and could transmit at 65 words per minute. The first announced use of the line was in 1967 during the Six-Day War involving Israel and its Arab neighbors.
Phil Graham, publisher of the US newspaper, The Washington Post, entered Chestnut Lodge, a psychiatric hospital in Rockville, Maryland, for the second time. Two weeks later, he would shoot himself.
The U.S. Civil Aeronautics Board refused to allow the proposed merger of American Airlines and Eastern Airlines.
Sled test No. 2, the first dynamic dual-ejection test of the Gemini escape system, was run at China Lake. Both seats ejected and all systems functioned properly. The test was scheduled to be rerun, however, because the sled failed to attain high enough velocity. The purpose of sled tests in the ejection seat development program was to simulate various high-altitude abort situations. Sled test No. 3 was successfully run on August 9. Further tests were delayed while the ejection system was being redesigned. A modified egress kit was tested in two dummy drops on December 12, with no problems indicated. Gemini Project Office directed McDonnell to proceed with plans for the next sled test. Developmental sled testing on the escape system, incorporating the redesigned egress kit and a soft survival pack, resumed on January 16, 1964, with test No. 4; all systems functioned normally. Test No. 5, the planned repetition of test No. 2, brought developmental sled testing to an end on February 7.
On June 20 and 21, a design review meeting was held at McDonnell to obtain comments and recommendations on the design of the Gemini spacecraft from experienced NASA personnel, including those who were active in the Mercury program. The meeting produced 76 requests for review, which NASA and McDonnell studied for possible changes in the spacecraft. A crew station mock-up review was held in conjunction with the design review.
In a meeting with a number of people from MSC's Spacecraft Technology and Instrumentation and Electronic Systems Divisions, J. E. Clair from Bendix Eclipse-Pioneer Division gave a progress report on the company's study of stabilization techniques for high-resolution telescopes aboard crewed space vehicles (work done under a contract awarded 9 November 1962). In part, MSC's purpose w as to ensure that Bendix's study reflect the Center's current definition of space stations. Clair and the MSC contingent explored a number of technical problems for different vehicle configurations, including pointing accuracy, fields of view, and physical location aboard the vehicle.

June 21, 1963 (Friday)
Cardinal Giovanni Battista Montini, the Archbishop of Milan, was elected as the 262nd pope, succeeding the late Pope John XXIII.  Cardinal Montini took the regnal name Pope Paul VI, the first pontiff with that name since Paul V (who reigned from 1605 to 1621), and would lead the Roman Catholic Church until his death in 1978.  Theologian Hans Küng would later write in his memoirs that "Montini got 57 votes, only two more than the two-thirds majority required," on the sixth ballot, with Cardinals Giacomo Lercaro of Bologna, Leo Joseph Suenens of Belgium and Augustin Bea of Germany having been under consideration as well. 
Leonid Brezhnev, the ceremonial President of the Presidium of the Soviet Union, was appointed to a position in the Secretariat of the Soviet Communist Party, and viewed as "the dominant contender for succession to Premier Khrushchev as party chief and possibly as head of the government".  The predictions proved to be correct, as Brezhnev would be named the Communist Party First Secretary upon the removal of Nikita Khrushchev on October 14, 1964.
The 13th Berlin International Film Festival opened.

June 22, 1963 (Saturday)
The French magazine Salut les copains organised a concert on the Place de la Nation in Paris, featuring singers such as Johnny Hallyday, Richard Anthony, Eddy Mitchell and Frank Alamo.  The concert attracted an audience of over 150,000. 
Born: Randy Couture, three-time UFC Heavyweight Champion; in Everett, Washington
Died: Maria Tănase, 49, Romanian folk singer, of cancer

June 23, 1963 (Sunday)
Israel's ruling MAPAI party selected Finance Minister Levi Eshkol to be the new party leader and Prime Minister of Israel.
New York Mets centerfielder Jimmy Piersall hit the 100th home run of his major league career, and his first with the Mets, and celebrated by running backwards around the bases.  The Mets beat the Phillies 5-0.  Piersall was dropped by the Mets soon after  and finished out his 1,734 game career with the Los Angeles Angels in 1967.
Byron De La Beckwith was arrested by the FBI on suspicion of the murder of Medgar Evers, and delivered to the police in Jackson, Mississippi, to be charged with violating the civil rights of Evers, rather than with his murder.
Jim Clark won the 1963 Dutch Grand Prix at Zandvoort.
The 1963 Tour de France began with 130 cyclists, representing 13 teams.
Born: Colin Montgomerie, Scottish professional golfer with six consecutive European Tour championships; in Glasgow

June 24, 1963 (Monday)
Landslides on South Korea's Geoje Island killed all 94 people in a village near Changsungpo. Another 22 people were killed in other landslides.
Zanzibar was granted self-rule, with full independence being granted on December 10.
The Telcan, the first system designed to be used at home for recording programs from a television set, was given its first demonstration. The system, shown in Nottingham, England, was seen to record programs onto a reel of videotape and then to play them back with "very fair video quality" on a  TV, could hold 30 minutes of programming, and had a suggested retail price of £60 ($175).
Arnold Engineering Development Center conducted a Gemini retrorocket abort test. Although test objectives were met, failures in the nozzle assembly and cone of the retrorocket led to the redesign of the nozzle assembly. Another abort test was scheduled for October 1963 to verify the redesign.
North American began a series of five drop tests, using a boilerplate test vehicle, to qualify the parachute recovery system for the full-scale test vehicle in the Paraglider Landing System Program. The reoriented paraglider program had begun with two successful bomb-drop tests of the parachute recovery system on May 22 and June 3. The first boilerplate drop test saw both the main parachute and the boilerplate suffer minor damage; but boilerplate drops No. 2 (July 2), No. 3 (July 12), and No. 4 (July 18) were successful. A series of malfunctions in the fifth drop test on July 30 produced a complete failure of the recovery system, and the test vehicle was destroyed on impact. North American considered the objectives of the flight qualification program on the parachute system to have been met, despite this failure, and requested, since the boilerplate vehicle had been damaged beyond repair, that the parachute program be considered complete. Manned Spacecraft Center denied this request and, in Change Notice No. 3 to contract NAS 9-1484, directed North American to support McDonnell in conducting two further drop tests. Wind tunnel tests on a 1/20-scale spacecraft model isolated the source of trouble, and the modified parachute recovery system was successfully tested with a new boilerplate test vehicle on November 12. Results from this test were confirmed by a second drop test on December 3, and the parachute recovery system for the full-scale test vehicle was judged and fully qualified.
Langley Research Center (LaRC) Director Floyd L. Thompson announced that two aerospace firms, The Boeing Company of Seattle and Douglas Aircraft Company, Inc., of Santa Monica, had been selected for final negotiations for study contracts of a Manned Orbital Research Laboratory (MORL) concept. Results of the comparative studies would contribute to NASA's research on ways to use humans in space effectively. Although no officially approved project for an orbital laboratory existed at the time, research within the agency over the past several years had developed considerable technology applicable to multiperson vehicles and had fostered much interest in such a project. Langley's MORL concept envisioned a four-person Workshop with periodic crew change and resupply, with at least one crew performing a year-long mission to evaluate the effect of weightlessness during long-duration space flights.
Born:
Ángel Azteca, Mexican professional wrestler ("luchador"); in Gómez Palacio, Durango (died 2007)
Sükhbaataryn Batbold, Prime Minister of Mongolia 2009-2012; in Choibalsan
Died: Prince Ferdinando, Duke of Genoa, 79

June 25, 1963 (Tuesday)
Veselin Đuranović replaced Đorđije Pajković as President of the Executive Council of Montenegro. Montenegro was, at that time, one of the six constituent republics that made up the Socialist Federal Republic of Yugoslavia.
Martin-Baltimore received the stage II fuel tank for Gemini launch vehicle 2 from Martin-Denver. This was a new tank, replacing a tank rejected for heat treatment cracks. Stage II oxidizer tank and stage I fuel and oxidizer tanks were received July 12 after a roll-out inspection at Martin-Denver July 1-3.
Born:
Kent Austin, NFL and CFL quarterback, college football and Canadian football coach; in Natick, Massachusetts
Yann Martel, Spanish-born Canadian writer; in Salamanca
George Michael, top-selling British pop music singer for Wham! and later a successful solo career; as Georgios Kyriacos Panayiotou, in East Finchley, London (d. 2016)

June 26, 1963 (Wednesday)
U.S. President Kennedy delivered his famous "Ich bin ein Berliner" speech in front of the Berlin Wall in West Berlin.  After climbing a specially built reviewing stand at the Brandenburg Gate so that he could look into East Berlin, Kennedy was driven to the West Berlin city hall, where he addressed a crowd of 150,000 people.  Kennedy began his speech by saying that "2,000 years ago, the proudest boast was civis Romanus sum [Latin, "I am a Roman"].  Today, in the world of freedom, the proudest boast is Ich bin ein Berliner [German, "I am a Berliner"]".
The Soviet Union's penal system was reformed to provide for "colony-settlements" (kolonii-poselenya) for prisoners who "displayed evidence of their aptitude for reintegration into society".
Paul McCartney and John Lennon wrote their hit song She Loves You, while staying at the Turk's Hotel in Newcastle-upon-Tyne.  Paul would later recall that when he played the recording for his father, the elder McCartney suggested (unsuccessfully) that "yeah, yeah, yeah" should be replaced with "Yes! Yes! Yes!".
The Canadian circus ship Fleurus caught fire and sank at Yarmouth, Nova Scotia. All people and animals were saved except for some zebras.
Born: Mikhail Khodorkovsky, Russian oil company owner and the wealthiest man in post-Soviet Russia, imprisoned 2003 to 2013 after opposing the government of Russian President Vladimir Putin, exiled since 2013; in Moscow

June 27, 1963 (Thursday)
A baronetcy was created in the British peerage for UK politician Ian Orr-Ewing.
In a visit to Ireland, U.S. President Kennedy visited Dunganstown, which his great-grandfather Patrick Kennedy had left in 1843 to emigrate to the United States. "If he hadn't left," Kennedy joked, "I'd be working at the Albatross Company", a local fertilizer factory. Kennedy was hosted by his third cousin, widow Mary Ann Ryan.
Henry Cabot Lodge, Jr., who had been the losing Republican candidate for Vice President of the United States in 1960, was nominated by the winner of that election, President Kennedy, to be the new U.S. ambassador to South Vietnam.
The state of Minnesota enacted the first law in the United States requiring modifications of buildings to provide accessibility for handicapped persons, with Governor Karl Rolvaag signing the bill.
Charles W. Mathews, Acting Manager of Gemini Project Office, reported to the Gemini Management Panel that the launching azimuth of the first Gemini mission had been changed from 90 to 72.5 degrees (the same as the Mercury orbital launches) to obtain better tracking network coverage. The spacecraft would be a complete production shell, including shingles and heatshield, equipped with a simulated computer, inertial measuring unit, and environmental control system in the reentry module. Simulated equipment would also be carried in the adapter section. The spacecraft would carry instruments to record pressures, vibrations, temperatures, and accelerations.

June 28, 1963 (Friday)
Two days after U.S. President Kennedy had delivered his "Ich bin ein Berliner" speech on the western side of the Berlin Wall, Soviet Premier Khrushchev gave a speech to workers at an East Berlin toolmaking factory and gave his response. According to reports, the English translation of the German translation of Khrushchev's Russian-language speech read, "I am told the President of the United States looked at the Wall with great indignation. Apparently, he didn't like it the least little bit. But I like it very much indeed. The working class of the German Democratic Republic has put up a wall and plugged the hole so that no more wolves can break in. Is that bad? It's good."
Carlos Hugo, Duke of Parma, pretender to the thrones of Parma and Spain, was officially renamed Charles Hugues, by judgment of the court of appeal of la Seine, France.
At a meeting on spacecraft operations, McDonnell presented a "scrub" recycle schedule as part of a continuing investigation of the capability of a delayed Gemini launch to meet successive launch windows during rendezvous missions. With no change in either existing aerospace ground equipment or the spacecraft, the recycle time was 48 hours (an earlier estimate had been 24 1/2 hours) for a trouble-free recycle. Gemini Project Office wanted recycle time reduced to 24 hours and ultimately to something less than 19 hours to meet successive launch windows, possibly by replacing fuel cells with batteries for rendezvous missions only.
Born: Babatunde Fashola, Nigerian politician, Governor of Lagos State; in Lagos
Died: 
John "Home Run" Baker, 77, American baseball player and National Baseball Hall of Fame inductee, American League home run leader for four seasons 1911 to 1914
Tom Dumay, 21, American SCUBA diver, a Montana State University senior and a member of the Flathead County Lifesaving and Rescue Association, drowned in Lake McDonald while searching for the body of 6-year-old Gregory Trenor, who had drowned the previous day in Glacier National Park, United States, 21-year-old. Dumay's diving partner, 21-year-old Ron Koppang, also of Columbia Falls, survived the dive but was treated for decompression sickness. Dumay's body was recovered the same day; Trenor's body was discovered on August 21.

June 29, 1963 (Saturday)
The University of East Africa was established by the University of London, with campuses in Kenya, Tanzania and Uganda.  In 1970, the university was split into three independent institutions, the University of Nairobi, Makerere University, and the University of Dar es Salaam.
The New York Journal American newspaper published a story headlined "High U.S. Aide Implicated in V-girl Scandal".  Included in the article, by investigative reporters James D. Horan and Dom Frasca, was mention that call-girl Suzy Chang was a "former paramour" of "one of the biggest names in American politics— a man who holds a very high elective office".  U.S. Attorney General Robert F. Kennedy, aware of the sexual encounters between his brother President John F. Kennedy and Chang, summoned Horan and Frasca to Washington for an interrogation and verified that the reporters "were indeed referring to his brother", then pressured them to halt further investigation.
The Saab 105 aircraft made its first flight.
Died:    
Ahmed Hilmi Pasha, 84, Palestinian leader and one time Prime Minister of the All-Palestine Government (1948);   
Frank Paul, 79, American science fiction illustrator

June 30, 1963 (Sunday)
A car bomb killed five police officers and two military engineers in Italy at Ciaculli, a suburb of Palermo on the island of Sicily.  A bomb that had been visible on the backseat of an Alfa Romeo car had been defused, but when a police officer opened the trunk of the automobile, a second bomb exploded.  The event was the culmination of the First Mafia War, breaking the unofficial peace pact between the police and the Mafia; over the next month, 10,000 police were sent from the Italian mainland and 250 mafiosi were arrested, suspending the activities of the Cosa Nostra. 
The Alfred-Brehm-Haus, at the time the largest enclosed zoo building in the world (5,300 m2 or 1.3 acres) was opened at Tierpark Berlin with enclosures for the larger felines (including lions, tigers, leopards, jaguars and pumas), and a large aviary. 
Jim Clark won the 1963 French Grand Prix at Reims-Gueux.
Pope Paul VI was crowned at Vatican's St. Peter's Square in the last papal coronation to date.

See also
The Five Cities of June

References

1963
1963-06
1963-06